A Bellini is a cocktail made with Prosecco and peach purée or nectar. It originated in Venice, Italy.

History
The Bellini was invented sometime between 1934 and 1948 by Giuseppe Cipriani, founder of Harry's Bar in Venice, Italy. He named the drink the Bellini because its unique pink color reminded him of the toga of a saint in a painting by 15th-century Venetian artist Giovanni Bellini.

The drink started as a seasonal specialty at Harry's Bar. Later, it also became popular at the bar's New York counterpart. After an entrepreneurial Frenchman set up a business to ship fresh white peach purée to both locations, it became a year-round favorite.

The Bellini is an IBA Official Cocktail. They also suggest a Puccini, replacing the peach purée with an equal amount of mandarin juice; a Rossini, which uses strawberry purée; or a Tintoretto, which is made with pomegranate juice.

Preparation and serving
The Bellini consists of puréed white peaches and Prosecco, an Italian sparkling wine. Marinating fresh peaches in wine is an Italian tradition. The original recipe was made with a bit of raspberry or cherry juice to give the drink a pink glow. Due in part to the limited availability of both white peaches and Prosecco, several variations exist.

California produces a white peach that works well, and yellow peaches or peach nectar can be substituted, especially if peaches are out of season and the flavor would be very bland. Other fruits or even flavoured liqueurs (peach schnapps, for example) are sometimes substituted for the peach purée.

The Cipriani family produces Bellini Base for the signature cocktail of the Harry's Bar restaurants.

Other sparkling wines are commonly used in place of Prosecco, though richly flavored French champagne does not pair well with the light, fruity flavor of the Bellini. For a non-alcoholic version, sparkling juice or seltzer is used in place of the wine.

Similar cocktails
The Cuban Adalor cocktail is a drink calling for fresh peach smashed with a fork and topped with Champagne. It was published in a Cuban drink guide book in 1927. The Adalor cup is a similar punch drink made with "melocoton" from the 1930 book Manual Oficial of the Club De Cantineros from Cuba. Melocoton is a peach grafted on a quince rootstock.

See also
 Italian cuisine
 List of cocktails

References

Italian alcoholic drinks
Cocktails with peach
Cocktails with Prosecco